Qoşabulaq is a village in the Jabrayil District of Azerbaijan. The village was under the occupation of the self-proclaimed Republic of Artsakh since the First Nagorno-Karabakh war until the Second Nagorno-Karabakh war, when President of Azerbaijan, Ilham Aliyev announced the village's recapture by Azerbaijani forces on 2 November 2020.

References 

Populated places in Jabrayil District